Hebrews 12 is the twelfth chapter of the Epistle to the Hebrews in the New Testament of the Christian Bible. The author is anonymous, although the internal reference to "our brother Timothy" (Hebrews 13:23) causes a traditional attribution to Paul, but this attribution has been disputed since the second century and there is no decisive evidence for the authorship. This chapter contains the call to respond gratefully and nobly to God's invitation.

Text
The original text was written in Koine Greek. This chapter is divided into 29 verses.

Textual witnesses
Some early manuscripts containing the text of this chapter are:
Papyrus 46 (175–225; complete)
Papyrus 13 (AD 225-250; extant verses 1-17)
Codex Vaticanus (325-350)
Codex Sinaiticus (330-360)
Codex Alexandrinus (400-440)
Codex Ephraemi Rescriptus (ca. 450; extant verses 16-29)
Codex Freerianus (~450; extant verses 1,7-9,16-18,25-27)
Codex Claromontanus (~550)
Codex Coislinianus (ca. 550; extant verses 10–15)

Old Testament references
 : 
 : 
 : 
 :

Jesus, the Pioneer and Perfecter of Faith (12:1–3)

Verses 1–2
Therefore we also, since we are surrounded by so great a cloud of witnesses, let us lay aside every weight, and the sin which so easily ensnares us, and let us run with endurance the race that is set before us, looking unto Jesus, the author and finisher of our faith, who for the joy that was set before Him endured the cross, despising the shame, and has sat down at the right hand of the throne of God.

Pay Heed to the Voice of God! (12:25–29)

Verse 28
 Therefore, since we are receiving a kingdom which cannot be shaken, let us have grace, by which we may[j] serve God acceptably with reverence and godly fear.

Uses

Music
Bobby McFerrin based the lyrics of the song "Discipline" from his 1990 album Medicine Music on several verses in this chapter.

See also

 Related Bible parts: Genesis 4, Genesis 27, Exodus 19, Deuteronomy 9, Proverbs 3, Haggai 2

References

Bibliography

External links
 King James Bible - Wikisource
English Translation with Parallel Latin Vulgate
Online Bible at GospelHall.org (ESV, KJV, Darby, American Standard Version, Bible in Basic English)
Multiple bible versions at Bible Gateway (NKJV, NIV, NRSV etc.)

12